Following 1972 Maharashtra Legislative Assembly election, incumbent chief minister Vasantrao Naik was re-appointed, and he formed his third government on 14 March 1972. This was to be Naik's last government which served until 20 February 1975.

Government formation
In the 1972 legislative elections, Indian National Congress secured 222 of the state's 278 assembly seats, leading to the incumbent chief minister being re-appointed. On 16 March 1972, a 21-member ministry was sworn in, consisting of 12 cabinet ministers, 8 ministers of state, and 1 deputy minister. Various ministers were later included in the ministry, and its membership had increased to 30 by November 1974.

List of ministers
The initial ministry consisted of the following 12 cabinet ministers.
 Vasantrao Naik, Chief Minister
 Vasantrao Patil
 Shankarrao Chavan
 M. D. Chaudhari
 N. M. Tidke
 Rafique Zakaria
 Y. J. Mohite
 H. G. Vartak
 A. R. Antulay
 Pratibha Patil
 A. N. Namjoshi
 M. B. Popat

Ministers of state
The initial ministry also consisted 8 ministers of state and 1 deputy minister.
 K. P. Patil
 S. B. Patil
 S. A. Solanke
 Sharad Pawar
 G. S. Sarnayak
 Prabha Rao
 R. J. Deotale
 D. T. Rupavate
 Ramubhai Patel, Deputy Minister

References

Indian National Congress
N
N
Cabinets established in 1972
Cabinets disestablished in 1975